Watersheddles Reservoir is an upland artificial lake in Lancashire, England. The reservoir was opened in 1877 by the Keighley Corporation Water Works, and is now owned by Yorkshire Water. It supplies water to the Worth Valley and Keighley area and compounds several streams at the source of the River Worth.

Although the reservoir is just across the boundary of Lancashire, all of the water is used in the West Yorkshire region.

Due to the peatland in the immediate catchment area, the reservoir is prone to a high acidity and discolouration in its water.

History
The building of the three reservoirs in the Upper Worth Valley (Watersheddles, Ponden and Lower Laithe), was so that the Keighley area could have a supply of fresh drinking water, and also in response to several droughts in the 1860s. These droughts forced residents in the Upper Worth Valley to raid mill-ponds for drinking water.

In response to the flooding, and as part of their endeavour to improve the water supply in Keighley and its environs, the Keighley Waterworks Extension and Improvement Act (1869) was passed to allow them to build "...an aqueduct, conduit, or watercourse commencing in the hamlet or liberty of Oakworth, in the township and parish of Keighley, in the said West Riding, at a point situate upon the stream called White Reaps Clough, distant 132 yards, or thereabouts, from the junction of the said stream with another stream called Dean Clough, and terminating in the northern side of the intended Water Sheddles Reservoir (proposed to be constructed by the Local Board under the powers of "The Keighley Waterworks Extension and Improvement Act, 1869 ") at a point 35 yards to the south of another point 320 yards distant (measured along the highway next hereinafter mentioned) from the Standing Stone on the boundary between the counties of York and Lancaster, such stone being placed on the highway leading from Keighley to Colne, such termination being in the hamlet of Wycoller...."

The reservoir needed to be quite elevated in comparison to the town of Keighley, so that the water pressure would be sufficient to pump water to the uppermost areas of the town and adjoining localities.

The name, which is recorded both as Watersheddles and Water Sheddles, is thought to have derived from Middle English meaning "the parting of the waters". The name is borrowed from a nearby boundary stone on the road between Stanbury and Laneshaw Bridge.

Although the contract for the building of the reservoir was awarded to Walker and Taylor of Crewe in June 1870, the reservoir was not started until August 1871, with full use and final flooding in 1877. A deal was agreed with the mill owners along the River Worth that guaranteed a ready-supply of water; every morning and every evening, the sluices were opened to allow a regulated flow of water down the valley to enable the mills to restock their ponds. Keighley Corporation Water Works operated the reservoir until 1959, when it was folded into the newly created Craven Water Board (CWB). The CWB, itself, was subsumed into Yorkshire Water in 1974. Whilst Yorkshire Water own the reservoir, unlike other reservoirs nearby that are in West Yorkshire, they do not own the surrounding land which drains into Watersheddles.

The short-distance path the Brontë Way, runs alongside the northern edge of the reservoir.

Hydrometry

Water from the reservoir is sent to a water treatment works (WTW) at Oldfield on the north side of the Worth Valley. Oldfield was opened in 1891 in an effort to treat the water from the reservoirs as the acidic water was eating into the pipes and poisoning the water with lead. A report from 1897 relays how the water is cleared through limestone, coke, sand and "polarite", but suffered from discolouration arising from peat sediment settling on the bottom of the reservoir. In 1973, just before Yorkshire Water assumed control of Watersheddles and Oldfield WTW, the pH of water arriving at Oldfield was registered as being between 6.9 and 7.0.

The waters entering the reservoir drain a peat moorland with millstone grit underlying. The water was recorded with a pH value of 4.1 in 1988 and has been noted for its 'colour', which takes a more intensive process to remedy at the WTW. The problems of the pH value at Watersheddles (and to an extent, Keighley Moor Reservoir) were so bad, that Yorkshire Water designed and built their own prototype triple-pH controller in 1988 to regulate the waters acidity.

In the late 1890s and early 1900s, a rain gauge was sited at Watersheddles, the results of which are given below;

The water at the reservoir between 2013 and 2016 was assessed as moderate for ecological quality and good for chemical quality.

Notes

References

Sources

External links
Image of Water Sheddles boundary stone

Drinking water reservoirs in England
Reservoirs in Lancashire
Geography of the Borough of Pendle